The 2010–11 season saw Leeds United A.F.C. return to the second tier of English football for the first time in four years with them finishing in a respectable 7th position in the Championship, just missing out on the play-offs. In other competitions, the club performed poorly in the League Cup, going out in their first match, however made it to the third round of the FA Cup forcing Premier League giants Arsenal to a replay in the process.

For the first time since 1990–91, Simon Grayson's team saw four players, Becchio (20), Gradel (18), Somma (12) and Howson (11), make it in to double figures in the scoring charts. After a disastrous 
end to the previous season, Gradel rejuvenated himself and picked up both the Fans' and Players' Player of the Year with Young Player going to the much improved Howson. Off the field, Chairman Ken Bates consolidated his ownership of the club by purchasing a majority shareholding in the club.

Events
This is a list of the significant events to occur at the club during the 2010–11 season, presented in chronological order (starting from 14 May 2010 and ending on the final day of the club's final match in the 2010–11 season. Results of any disclipinaries etc. relevant to this season are also listed.) This list does not include transfers or new contracts, which are listed in the transfers section below, or match results, which are in the matches section.

May

14 May: The club release a "released and retained" list with eight players being released, two players being offered new contracts and four players – Trésor Kandol, Ľubomír Michalík, Andy Robinson and Alan Sheehan – being placed on the transfer list.

June
17 June: The fixtures for the 2010–11 Championship campaign are revealed. Leeds start the season on 7 August at home to Derby County and will finish it away at QPR on 8 May.

July

1 July: The players return for pre-season training with new faces including Fede Bessone, Paul Connolly, Billy Paynter and Kasper Schmeichel.
8 July: Manager Simon Grayson confirms that Richard Naylor will remain club captain for the new season.
10 July: The squad depart to Slovakia for their pre-season tour. The travelling squad includes all first teamers except transfer listed Kandol, Michalik, Robinson and Sheehan, injured Naylor and Parker and youngsters Darville, Elliott and Hatfield.
13 July: Simon Grayson signs a new three-year contract as club manager.
29 July: The squad numbers for the new season are announced with no. 2 Crowe being demoted to no. 20 in favour of Connolly. Meanwhile, Gradel is promoted to no. 7 from no. 28 and the four transfer listed players, plus Elliott and Hatfield, are demoted to higher numbers. Paynter takes over the no. 9 shirt from last season's top scorer Jermaine Beckford while Schmeichel is made no. 1 with Collins, Sam and Bessone being handed numbers 5, 11 and 21 respectively.

August

17 August: The club are charged for failing to ensure their players conducted themselves in an orderly fashion after a mass brawl with the opposition players during the 1–1 draw with Nottingham Forest on 15 August. Forest are also charged with a three match ban being handed to their player Chris Gunter whose stamp on Leeds striker Sanchez Watt started the brawl.
18 August: Club chairman Ken Bates slams the charge on the club by The FA in regard to the Forest game, stating that the club will defend themselves and back up Watt. Meanwhile, it is revealed that the club spent £335,723 on agents fees during the 2009–10 season – the third highest in League One.
24 August: Leeds are fined £7,500 and Nottingham Forest £12,500 after the mass brawl during the match nine days ago.

November

18 November: Midfielder Bradley Johnson is put on the transfer list after rejecting a new contract.

December

10 December: Defender Jason Crowe is put on the transfer list after declining several loan offers from other clubs.

April

4 April: The club announce they have made a profit of £2.072 million in the 2009–10 financial year. It is also disclosed that the club's turnover increased by 16% to £27.446 million. In addition, it is noted that gate receipts totalled £11.732 million, rising 30.8% with merchandising increasing by 12% to £5.509 million. In their statement, it is revealed that the total wage bill of the playing and football management staff in the relevant financial year was £7.706 million with the value of the entire squad estimated at £6.667 million.

May
3 May: The club announce that on 26 April 2011, chairman Ken Bates became the controlling shareholder of the club after his company Outro Limited purchased Forward Sports Fund Limited, the company who own 72.85% (102,000,000 shares) of the shares in Leeds City Holdings Limited (L.C.H.) – the parent company of Leeds United Football Club Limited (the company that holds the share in the Football League, is a member of the West Riding County Football Association and an Associate Member of the FA) for an undisclosed fee. It is noted that the remaining 27.15% (approx. 38,013,727 shares) of shares in L.C.H. are owned by four unconnected shareholders, with none of them holding more than 10% of the shares.
6 May: The club plead guilty to the FA charge of "failing to ensure that their players conducted themselves in an orderly fashion and/or refrained from provocative behaviour" in regard to the mass brawl against Burnley six days ago
7 May: The club finish The Championship season in 7th place, thus missing out on the play-offs.
10 May: The FA fine both Leeds and Burnley £5,000 in relation to the brawl between their players in the April match. Leeds are fined an additional £7,500 as they had recently been found guilty of a separate improper conduct charge.

Players

First team squad information

Appearances (starts and substitute appearances) and goals include those in The Championship (and playoffs), League One (and playoffs), FA Cup, League Cup and Football League Trophy.
1Player first came to the club on loan and was transferred the following year.

Squad stats

Captains

Assists 

Last updated:18 Apr 2011
Source: BBC Sport

Disciplinary record

Suspensions

Ordered by date of suspension handed.

International call-ups

Ordered by squad number.Does not include appearances and goals made prior to the 2010–11 season or prior to joining the club.

Transfers

In

Note: Bessone is EU national as he holds an Italian passport.
1Contract includes an optional one-year extension clause.
2Although officially undisclosed, it was reported by Vital Football that the fee was £400,000.
3Player joined the club on a non-contract basis with selection eligibility for the reserve team only. Warner only played one game before moving on to Scunthorpe United. It was rumoured that Warner rejected a six-month contract with the club.

Loans In

1Manager Simon Grayson confirmed in an interview with LUTV that Alnwick returned to Tottenham Hotspur after the behind-closed-doors match against Sunderland due to a thigh strain.

Loans Out

1The player returned to the club on 1 January following his first loan spell and returned to Oldham Athletic on 27 January with a deal lasting until the end of the season.

Out

1Kandol finished the 2009–10 season with the shirt number 20, however was absent during the 2010–11 season shirt number announcement with Jason Crowe taking his number. Kandol was last seen wearing the number 33 shirt during pre-season training.
2It has been confirmed that the fee paid by Sheffield United was higher than the £500k that Leeds paid for Collins in the summer to Preston.

New Contracts

1The contract includes the option to extend the contract by a further year.

Pre-season

Competitions

Championship

Table

Results summary

Results by round

Championship

FA Cup

League Cup

Awards

Internal Awards

Official Player of the Year Awards

The results of the 2010–11 Leeds United A.F.C. Player of the Year Awards were announced at a dinner on 30 April 2011 at Elland Road.

Player of the Year:  Max Gradel
Young Player of the Year: Jonny Howson
Players' Player of the Year: Max Gradel
Goal of the Season: Bradley Johnson (vs Arsenal, 19 January)
Best Contribution to Community: Jonny Howson
Chairman's Special Award: Harvey Sharman (Head Physiotherapist)

External Awards

Championship Team of the Week
The following Leeds players have been selected in the official Championship team of the week.

31 August: Kasper Schmeichel 
27 September: Bradley Johnson 
18 October: Luciano Becchio 
1 November: Jonathan Howson, Andy O'Brien 
8 November: Robert Snodgrass 
15 November: Luciano Becchio 
22 November: Max Gradel 
6 December: Robert Snodgrass, Luciano Becchio 
13 December: Jonathan Howson 
20 December: Kasper Schmeichel, Robert Snodgrass, Max Gradel 
14 February: Eric Lichaj, Robert Snodgrass, Max Gradel 
21 February: Robert Snodgrass 
7 March: Jonathan Howson, Max Gradel 
4 April: Leigh Bromby, Max Gradel

Other
PFA Fans' Player of the Month (The Championship): Luciano Becchio (November), Robert Snodgrass (January, February), Jonny Howson (April)
LMA Manager of the Month (The Championship): Simon Grayson (December)
FA Cup Player of the Round: Kasper Schmeichel (3rd round)

References

External links

Official Website
Sky Sports
Soccerbase
ESPNsoccernet 

Leeds United F.C. seasons
Leeds United
Foot